Coleford is a village and civil parish in Somerset, England, situated on the Mells River in the Mendip Hills five miles west of Frome. The parish has a population of 2,313 in 2011.

History

Coleford was listed in the Domesday Book of 1086 as Colford, meaning the hill ford, possibly from the Old French col and ford, or alternatively the coal ford, a ford over which charcoal was carried.

There are visible remains of a famous unfinished engineering project, the Dorset and Somerset Canal aqueduct, known locally as the 'Huckyduck', which was abandoned in 1803.

The village once had several coal mines as part of the now closed Somerset coalfield. Just north of Coleford there were the collieries of Newbury and Mackintosh. Mackintosh opened in 1867 but closed in 1919, due to flooding. The Natural Stone Products factory is built on the site of Newbury Colliery. This pit started around the beginning of the 19th century and closed in 1927. The Coal Barton mine was the scene of a firedamp explosion which killed nine miners in 1869.

Governance

The parish council has responsibility for local issues, including setting an annual precept (local rate) to cover the council’s operating costs and producing annual accounts for public scrutiny. The parish council evaluates local planning applications and works with the local police, district council officers, and neighbourhood watch groups on matters of crime, security, and traffic. The parish council's role also includes initiating projects for the maintenance and repair of parish facilities, as well as consulting with the district council on the maintenance, repair, and improvement of highways, drainage, footpaths, public transport, and street cleaning. Conservation matters (including trees and listed buildings) and environmental issues are also the responsibility of the council.

The village falls within the Non-metropolitan district of Mendip, which was formed on 1 April 1974 under the Local Government Act 1972, having previously been part of Frome Rural District, which is responsible for local planning and building control, local roads, council housing, environmental health, markets and fairs, refuse collection and recycling, cemeteries and crematoria, leisure services, parks, and tourism.

Somerset County Council is responsible for running the largest and most expensive local services such as education, social services, libraries, main roads, public transport, policing and  fire services, trading standards, waste disposal and strategic planning.

The village falls within the 'Coleford and Holcombe' electoral Ward. The ward stretches in the east from Coleford before going west to Holcombe and then south west to Stoke St. Michael. Mells is also included.
The total ward population as at the 2011 census was 4,700.

It is also part of the Somerton and Frome county constituency represented in the House of Commons of the Parliament of the United Kingdom. It elects one Member of Parliament (MP) by the first past the post system of election, and was part of the South West England constituency of the European Parliament prior to Britain leaving the European Union in January 2020, which elected seven MEPs using the d'Hondt method of party-list proportional representation.

Religious sites

The Anglican Parish Church of The Holy Trinity was built in 1831 by J. Sperring. The Methodist Chapel is a little more recent having been built in 1865.

References

External links

Villages in Mendip District
Somerset coalfield
Civil parishes in Somerset